Comic Relief Does Fame Academy, a spin-off of the original Fame Academy show where celebrities students sing as students of the Academy to help raise money for the charities supported by Comic Relief, returned for a second live airing on 26 February 2005. It was once again hosted by Patrick Kielty and Cat Deeley. During the Comic Relief show on 11 March (Red Nose Day), Edith Bowman was announced as the winner.

Contestants

Production and broadcasting
The production and broadcasting for the live shows took place at a new location - the former Lambeth College site between Tower Bridge and London City Hall on the south bank of the River Thames. The building had originally been home to St Olave's Grammar School between 1855 and 1967.

Format
The elimination mechanism was the same as the second series proper, however Park no longer had a casting vote in the event of the Judges' vote being tied, with the public vote resolving any deadlock.

Teachers
There were changes for this series. Strictly Come Dancing judge Craig Revel Horwood and opera star Lesley Garrett were brought in as judges. Singing coaches Carrie and David Grant were no longer on the judging panel, but were present during the live shows and were invited to give their views when necessary.

Guests
The five remaining students were given a masterclass courtesy of McFly, who released All About You as Comic Relief's official single that year.

Conflict
The series had its fair share of drama and conflict.

Kielty VS. Park
As with series two of the main show, host Patrick Kielty and headteacher Richard Park clashed continually throughout the series. While it was assumed by some that the arguments were staged to build up interest for the show, this appeared to be disproved when Richard Park was spotted making a rude hand gesture towards Patrick Kielty, as co-host Cat Deeley was attempting to introduce the next act. The BBC received over 400 complaints, although Kielty joked about the incident in a subsequent episode. A spokeswoman for the programme said: "Richard Park did not realise he was on camera at the time. It is a live show and tensions were running high but we are really sorry if any offence was caused." [1]

The feud between Kielty and Park spilled over into the press after the show had ended. Park claimed that Kielty's presenting skills had been "sub-standard" and speculated that he would never be seen on BBC screens again. Kielty was later announced as the host of ITV's Celebrity Love Island.

Craig Revel Horwood
Teachers Carrie and David were also involved in a feud with Craig Revel Horwood. Horwood regularly criticised the performances of the celebrities, particularly Debra Stephenson and Reggie Yates. In one episode of the show, Carrie accused Craig of trying to kill the spirits of the singers.

Results and elimination

 Indicates the winning contestant
 Indicates the contestant who was eliminated from the competition
 Indicates the contestant who was the Grade A student for the week
 Indicates a contestant who was safe, and was neither the Grade A student or facing probation
 Indicates a contestant who faced probation, but was saved by the public vote.
 Indicates a contestant who faced probation, but was saved by their fellow students
 Indicates a contestant who was unable to perform at the live show
 Indicates a contestant who was not eliminated from the show, but had to withdraw due to illness
 Indicates that the contestant had been eliminated from the show, and was no longer competing at the academy.

Notes:
 Note 1: The eliminated students returned to vote.

Voting Controversy
There was also some speculation that the students were colluding with each other during the student vote to ensure 'close' results. The contestants asked the producers to be excused of the student vote, however the producers refused.

Because of this, many felt the students deliberately invoked a tie when there was only six left, so that the public would have the casting vote. To stop this happening in the semi-final, where a tie was also possible, ex-students also voted (making 11 votes in total, meaning no tie was possible. Therefore one student was put in the final by the public, another by the Judges and the third by the former and current students.

External links

References

British reality television series
2005 British television seasons
Comic Relief
Fame Academy